These are lists of rocket and mortar attacks on Israel by Palestinian militant groups.

2000s 
List of Palestinian rocket attacks on Israel in 2001
List of Palestinian rocket attacks on Israel in 2002–2006
List of Palestinian rocket attacks on Israel in 2007
List of Palestinian rocket attacks on Israel in 2008
List of Palestinian rocket attacks on Israel in 2009

2010s 
List of Palestinian rocket attacks on Israel in 2010
List of Palestinian rocket attacks on Israel in 2011
List of Palestinian rocket attacks on Israel in 2012
List of Palestinian rocket attacks on Israel in 2013
List of Palestinian rocket attacks on Israel in 2014
List of Palestinian rocket attacks on Israel in 2015
List of Palestinian rocket attacks on Israel in 2016
List of Palestinian rocket attacks on Israel in 2017
List of Palestinian rocket attacks on Israel in 2018
List of Palestinian rocket attacks on Israel in 2019

2020s 
List of Palestinian rocket attacks on Israel in 2020
List of Palestinian rocket attacks on Israel in 2021

See also 
List of Palestinian suicide attacks
List of rocket attacks from Lebanon on Israel
Military operations of the Israeli–Palestinian conflict
Palestinian rocket attacks on Israel
Timeline of the Israeli–Palestinian conflict

Second Intifada
Rocket weapons of Palestine
Terrorist attacks attributed to Palestinian militant groups
Terrorism-related lists
Israeli–Palestinian conflict-related lists
Lists of events in Israel